Dead to Me may refer to:

Music 

 "Dead to Me", a song on the 2017 album Mis•an•thrope by the American nu metal band Ded.
Dead to Me, a 2000 album by the American metal band STEMM
Dead to Me (band), an American punk rock band
Dead to Me (Girls Names album), a 2011 album by the Irish indie band Girls Names
"Dead to Me", a song on the 2014 EP Dollhouse by the American pop singer Melanie Martinez
 "Dead to Me", a song by singer Kali Uchis from her 2018 debut album Isolation

Television 

Dead to Me (TV series), a 2019 black comedy television series